Tuol Pongro is a commune (khum) of Malai District in Banteay Meanchey Province in north-western Cambodia.

Villages
As of 2020, the commune includes 12 villages (phums) as follows.

References

Communes of Banteay Meanchey province
Malai District